The  vulturine guineafowl  (Acryllium vulturinum) is the largest extant species of guineafowl. Systematically, it is only distantly related to other guineafowl genera. Its closest living relative, the white breasted guineafowl, Agelastes meleagrides inhabit primary forests in Central Africa. It is a member of the bird family Numididae, and is the only member of the genus Acryllium. It is a resident breeder in northeast Africa, from southern Ethiopia through Kenya and just into northern Tanzania.

Description

The vulturine guineafowl is a large bird with a round body and small head. It has a longer wings, neck, legs and tail than other guineafowl. The adult has a bare blue face and black neck, and although all other guineafowl have unfeathered heads, this species looks particularly like a vulture because of the long bare neck and head.

The slim neck projects from a cape of long, glossy, blue and white hackles. The breast is cobalt blue, and the rest of the body plumage is black, finely spangled with white. The wings are short and rounded, and the tail is longer than others in the family Numididae.

The sexes are similar, although the female is usually slightly smaller than the male and with smaller tarsal spurs.  Young birds are mainly grey-brown, with a duller blue breast and short hackles.

Behaviour
The vulturine guineafowl is a gregarious species, forming flocks outside the breeding season typically of about 25 birds. This species' food is seeds and small invertebrates. This guineafowl is terrestrial and will run rather than fly when alarmed. Despite the open habitat, it tends to keep to cover, and roosts in trees. It makes loud chink-chink-chink-chink-chink calls.

It breeds in dry and open habitats with scattered bushes and trees, such as savannah or grassland. It usually lays 4–8 cream-coloured eggs in a well-hidden grass-lined scrape.

References

Further reading 
 Pheasants, Partridges and Grouse by Madge and McGowan,

External links 

  Avicultural Data and Images
  BirdLife International Factsheet

vulturine guineafowl
Birds of the Horn of Africa
vulturine guineafowl